Dato' Paduka Haji Ahmad bin Kassim (born 24 March 1963) is a Malaysian politician. He was the Member of the Parliament of Malaysia for the Kuala Kedah constituency in Kedah for one term from 2008 to 2013. He sat in Parliament as a member of the People's Justice Party (PKR) in the opposition Pakatan Rakyat coalition.

Kassim was elected to the Kuala Kedah seat in the 2008 election, defeating Hashim Jahaya of the ruling Barisan Nasional coalition. He served one term in Parliament; before the 2013 election he was replaced as PKR's candidate for the seat by Azman Ismail, who went on to retain the seat for the opposition party.

Election results

Honours 
  :
 Knight Commander of the Order of Loyalty to Sultan Sallehuddin (DPSS) - Dato' Paduka (2019)

References

Living people
1963 births
People from Kedah
People's Justice Party (Malaysia) politicians
Malaysian people of Malay descent
Malaysian Muslims
Members of the Dewan Rakyat
Speakers of the Kedah State Legislative Assembly